The Serie B 1963–64 was the thirty-second tournament of this competition played in Italy since its creation.

Teams
Varese, Prato and Potenza had been promoted from Serie C, while Napoli, Venezia and Palermo had been relegated from Serie A.

Final classification

Results

References and sources
Almanacco Illustrato del Calcio - La Storia 1898-2004, Panini Edizioni, Modena, September 2005

Serie B seasons
2
Italy